Julian Paynter (born 15 July 1970 in Edinburgh, Scotland) is a retired male long-distance runner, who represented Australia at the 1996 Summer Olympics in Atlanta, Georgia. There he was eliminated in the semi-finals of the men's 5,000 metres competition. He set his personal best (13:24.22) in the men's 5,000 metres on 19 November 1995 in Melbourne, Australia. Julian's second oldest child also has much potential in his athletic ability. After his athletics career he started participating in top level cycling races in Australia, like the historic Melbourne to Warrnambool Classic.

References 

1970 births
Living people
Australian male long-distance runners
Athletes (track and field) at the 1994 Commonwealth Games
Athletes (track and field) at the 1996 Summer Olympics
Olympic athletes of Australia
Sportspeople from Edinburgh
Australian Institute of Sport track and field athletes
Commonwealth Games competitors for Australia